Siber may refer to:

People
 George Siber (born 1944), American-Canadian medical researcher
 Helmut Siber (born 1942), Austrian footballer and manager
 Sibel Siber (born 1960), Turkish Cypriot politician

Vehicles
 GAZ Volga Siber, a 2008–2010 Russian mid-size sedan

See also
 Siberia, a geographical region in Russia
 Siberia (disambiguation)
 Sibir (disambiguation)